Robert Bernard Schnelker (October 17, 1928 – December 12, 2016) was an American football tight end who played for nine seasons in the National Football League, mainly with the New York Giants. Schnelker played college football at Bowling Green State University and was drafted in the 29th round of the 1950 NFL Draft by the Cleveland Browns.  Schnelker was a two-time Pro Bowler and a member of the 1956 NFL Champion Giants. After retiring from football, he was an assistant coach with the Los Angeles Rams, Miami Dolphins, Detroit Lions, Kansas City Chiefs, Green Bay Packers and the Minnesota Vikings.  He died on December 12, 2016, in Naples, Florida.

Coaching career
1963–1965 Los Angeles Rams (WR/TE)
1966–1971 Green Bay Packers (Assistant)
1972–1973 San Diego Chargers (OC)
1974 Miami Dolphins (WR)
1975–1977 Kansas City Chiefs (Assistant)
1978–1981 Detroit Lions (Assistant)
1982–1985 Green Bay Packers (OC/TE)
1986–1990 Minnesota Vikings (OC)

References

1928 births
2016 deaths
American football tight ends
Bowling Green Falcons football players
Philadelphia Eagles players
New York Giants players
Minnesota Vikings players
Minnesota Vikings coaches
Pittsburgh Steelers players
Eastern Conference Pro Bowl players
People from Galion, Ohio
National Football League offensive coordinators